Imre Csáky (28 October 1672 – 28 August 1732) was a Hungarian Roman Catholic cardinal.

Biography
Imre Csáky was born to Count István Csáky and Klára Melith in Spiš Castle (nowadays in Slovakia), a fief of his family. He studied in Košice, Vienna and Rome and was ordained priest, starting his ecclesiastical career in Eger and then in Košice and Esztergom. In 1703 he was appointed abbot of Szent Gothárdi.

On 25 June 1703, he was elected bishop of Nagyvárad (present Oradea, Romania). On 19 November 1714, he was promoted metropolitan archbishop of Archdiocese of Kalocsa and held the Nagyvárad diocese as apostolic administrator until his death.

Csáky was created cardinal priest in pectore in the consistory of 12 July 1717 by Pope Clement XI with the title of Sant'Eusebio. He took part in the Papal conclave of 1721, but not in those of 1724 and 1730. He died in 1732 in a castle he had built near Nagyvárad.

References

External links
 S. Miranda – The Cardinals of the Holy Roman Church

1672 births
1732 deaths
Archbishops of Kalocsa
People from Spišská Nová Ves District
Hungarians in Slovakia
18th-century Hungarian cardinals
18th-century Roman Catholic archbishops in Hungary
Imre, Csaky